Bagauda zigzag is a species of assassin bug discovered in Taiwan in 2007 in an area of uplifted coral reef forest. One individual was observed to prey upon a spider. The species is nocturnal and individuals were most commonly found on Chinese banyan (Ficus microcarpa L.) and King fig (Ficus ampelos Burm.f.) (Moraceae).

References

Reduviidae
Hemiptera of Asia
Insects described in 2010